Levitation (formerly Austin Psych Fest) is an annual 3-day music festival developed and produced by The Reverberation Appreciation Society. Since its sixth year in 2013 it has been held at Carson Creek Ranch in Austin, Texas. Inspired by the creative explosion of the 1960s, as well as by festivals such as ATP and Primavera Sound, they set out to create their vision of a music festival.

Over the years, this independent festival has grown to an internationally acclaimed, full weekend event that attracts attendees from all over the world. In 2015 Austin Psych Fest was renamed "Levitation" in honor of Austin's psychedelic  rock pioneers The 13th Floor Elevators.

The Reverberation Appreciation Society is a creative collective composed of Rob Fitzpatrick, Oswald James, and Christian Bland and Alex Maas of The Black Angels. In addition to the festival in Austin, the group has branched out into other cities beginning in 2013 with Levitation France and in 2015 with Levitation Vancouver and Levitation Chicago. The group also runs The Reverberation Appreciation Society record label and has curated events at Austin's SXSW, The Netherlands' Le Guess Who?, NYC's CMJ and NRMAL in Mexico City.

Levitation Austin 
The inaugural Austin Psych Fest was held on Saturday 8 March 2008 at The Red Barn in north Austin, featuring performances by The Black Angels, Ringo Deathstarr Horse + Donkey among others.

In 2009, the festival was extended to three days and was held from March 13–15 at the Radio Room, a short lived venue on Sixth Street. The Seeds' Sky Saxon performed with Shapes Have Fangs as his backing band and Austin psychedelic legends The Golden Dawn performed their 1968 album "Power Plant" in its entirety.  The lineup included modern psychedelic heavies Dead Meadow, A Place to Bury Strangers, Wooden Shjips, The Warlocks, and The Black Angels.

The third Austin Psych Fest was held April 23–25, 2010 at The Mohawk, a multi-stage venue on Red River. 41 acts performed, among them, The Raveonettes, Warpaint, The Gaslamp Killer, The Black Angels and 1960s legends Silver Apples.

The 2011 festival was held on April 29-May 1 at the 1950s art deco Seaholm Power Plant, a decommissioned steam power plant on the bands of Lady Bird Lake in downtown Austin that had been made temporarily available for events. Due to changes in city ordinances and construction plans, the festival changed venues 3 times before landing back at its originally intended location, The Seaholm Power Plant, and the festival would be the last concert held within the plant's walls.  The 63 band bill was topped by Roky Erickson of The 13th Floor Elevators, Spacemen 3 offshoot Spectrum, Omar A Rodriguez group playing as The Mars Volta lineup, Crystal Stilts, the first performance from Black Moth Super Rainbow in several years, and The Black Angels.

Austin Psych Fest 2012 was held  April 27–29 at the east-side location of legendary music venue Emo's in conjunction with the Beauty Ballroom.  The 5th annual festival featured a 61 band lineup including The Brian Jonestown Massacre, The Black Angels, and the Black Lips along with Meat Puppets, The Olivia Tremor Control, Thee Oh Sees, and Bombino, among others.

The 2013 and 2014 festivals were held at Carson Creek Ranch in Austin, Texas, located on the Colorado River (Texas). The 2013 festival, the 6th annual festival, held April 26–28, was the first year for the festival to be held at a completely outdoor venue, as well as the first year to have 3 stages of music, camping, and a poster series featuring US and international artists. The seventh annual festival, held May 2–4, 2014,  included 1960s legends The Zombies, as well as Panda Bear, The Horrors, Loop, The Brian Jonestown Massacre, of Montreal, The Dandy Warhols, The Black Angels and many more.

In late 2014 The Reverberation Appreciation Society changed the festival's name from Austin Psych Fest to Levitation, titled after a track by Austin psychedelic legends The 13th Floor Elevators.

The 2015 festival was held May 8–10 at Carson Creek Ranch.  The lineup included The Flaming Lips, The Jesus and Mary Chain, Primal Scream, Spiritualized, Tame Impala as well as a reunion performance by The 13th Floor Elevators, the band's first performance in 45 years.

The dates for the 2016 festival were April 29 - May 1, 2016, and the lineup featured Brian Wilson performing Pet Sounds, Ween, Animal Collective, Caribou, Flying Lotus, Slowdive, Courtney Barnett, Sleep, The Arcs, Brian Jonestown Massacre and many more.

The 2016 festival at Carson Creek Ranch was cancelled due to severe weather which caused significant damage to the festival grounds and infrastructure. In response over 20 concerts were organized in downtown Austin hosting the lineup and attendees.

In November 2016, festival organizers announced that the festival would not be held in 2017, but would return in 2018.

Due to the COVID-19 pandemic, the festival went on hiatus in 2020. The next year saw the hiatus extended by a year. Leviatation resumed with it’s anticipated 2022 lineup. 

Levitation hosted Kikagaku Moyo for their last tour in the USA.

Levitation France 
Created in 2013, Levitation France is held annually at Le Chabada in Angers, France.  The first Levitation France was held on September 20–21, 2013, hosting a 17-band lineup including The Black Angels, Dead Meadow, Night Beats, Wall of Death, and The UFO Club. The second Levitation France festival was held September 19–20, 2014 and included Loop, Moon Duo, Woods, Allah-Las, La Femme, and Al Lover. Levitation France 2015 took place September 18–19, 2015.

Films 
The Reverberation Appreciation Society has released a number of concert films. I've Got Levitation documents the 50th anniversary reunion of The 13th Floor Elevators at the Levitation 2015 music festival, the band's first performance in 45 years. The documentary, directed by James Oswald and Jack Henry Robbins, offers an immersive glimpse into the festival with interviews and performances by The 13th Floor Elevators, The Flaming Lips, The Black Angels, Jesus And Mary Chain, The GOASTT (Sean Lennon), Thee Oh Sees, Fuzz (Ty Segall), Mac Demarco, Lightning Bolt, Night Beats, and others. The film premiered at Alamo Drafthouse on April 25, 2018.

Austin Psych Fest: Beyond the Third Sound features footage from Austin Psych Fest 2013 and includes performances and interviews with The Black Angels, Roky Erickson, Clinic, White Fence, Acid Mothers Temple, and Tinariwen, among others.  Other concert films released include APF 2012, APF 2011 "Live at the Power Plant," and APF 3, which features footage from Austin Psych Fest 2010.

Austin Lineups

2016

Brian Wilson performing Pet Sounds
Animal Collective
Caribou
Flying Lotus
Slowdive
Sleep
Nicolas Jaar
The Brian Jonestown Massacre
The Black Angels
Ty Segall
Lee "Scratch" Perry
Sunn O)))
Super Furry Animals
Royal Trux
Boris
Thurston Moore Band
Black Mountain
Allah-Las
Uncle Acid & the Deadbeats
Parquet Courts
Dungen
Oneohtrix Point Never
Shabazz Palaces
Woods
King Gizzard & the Lizard Wizard
Lee Ranaldo
Twin Peaks
La Luz
Boogarins
Heron Oblivion
Imarhan
Purson
Quraishi
Mild High Club
Israel Nash
Fantasmes
Chicano Batman
Ultimate Painting
Asteroid #4
Bayonne
La Mecanica Popular
Blondi's Salvation
The Murlocs
Flavor Crystal
JJUUJJUU
Cellar Doors

2015 

 The 13th Floor Elevators 
 The Flaming Lips 
 Tame Impala 
 Primal Scream 
 The Jesus and Mary Chain 
 Spiritualized 
 The Black Angels 
 Thee Oh Sees 
 Mac DeMarco 
 Lightning Bolt 
 The Sword 
 The GOASTT 
 Earth 
 DIIV 
 Health 
 A Place to Bury Strangers 
 This Will Destroy You 
 Fuzz * The Soft Moon 
 METZ * White Fence 
 Hundred Visions 
 Tamaryn 
 Night Beats 
 The Fat White Family 
 Mini Mansions 
 Föllakzoid 
 The Black Ryder 
 Ringo Deathstarr 
 Indian Jewelry 
 Nothing 
 The Myrrors * Mystic Braves 
 Spindrift 
 Las Robertas 
 Holy Wave 
 Vaadat Charigim 
 Willie Thrasher & Linda Saddlebeck 
 Ryley Walker * Mugstar 
 The Flowers of Hell
 The Blank Tapes 
 Fever the Ghost 
 Mr. Elevator & The Brain Hotel 
 ZZZ's * Eternal Tapestry 
 Samsara Blues Experiment 
 Paperhead 
 White Manna 
 Gourishankar Karmakar & Indrajit Banarjee 
 Jeff Zeigler & Mary Lattimore 
 Chui Wan 
 SURVIVE 
 Los Mundos 
 LA Witch 
 Heaters 
 Sungod 
 The Holydrug Couple 
 Creepoid 
 Ex Cult 
 The Well 
 Tele Novella 
 Ryan Sambol 
 Dallas Acid 
 Baby Robots 
 Hollow Trees

2014 
 The Brian Jonestown Massacre
 The Dandy Warhols
 The Zombies
 The Black Angels
 Black Lips
 Acid Mothers Temple
 Graveyard
 Shannon and the Clams
 King Gizzard and the Lizard Wizard
 The Fresh & Onlys
 Quilt
 Liars
 La Femme
 White Hills
 Kadavar
 The Horrors
 Unknown Mortal Orchestra
 Temples
 Bombino
 Dead Meadow
 The Golden Dawn
 Bardo Pond
 Boogarins
 Of Montreal
 Avey Tare's Slasher Flicks
 Medicine
 The Octopus Project
 Zombie Zombie
 Yamantaka // Sonic Titan
 Loop
 Panda Bear
 The War on Drugs
 Mikal Cronin
 The Young
 Pink Mountaintops
 Sleepy Sun
 Joel Gion & The Primary Colours
 Tobacco
 Bo Ningen
 Earthless
 Toy
 Guardian Alien
 Steve Gunn
 Woods
 Gap Dream
 Hollis Brown
 Brown Sabbath
 Terakaft
 Bone Fur & Feathers
 Peaking Lights
 Aqua Nebula Oscillator
 Roger Sellers
 The Eagle's Gift
 Morgan Delt
 Pure X
 Residuels
 Mirror Travel
 Jacco Gardner
 Barn Owl
 Mark McGuire
 Circuit Des Yeux
 Mono
 Moon Duo
 Destruction Unit
 Dahga Bloom
 Perhaps
 Cosmonauts
 Christian Bland & The Revelators
 Charlie Magira
 Chris Catalena & The Native Americans
 Kikagaku Moyo
 Doug Tuttle
 Greg Ashley
 Fantasmes
 Mind over Mirrors
 Higgins Waterproof Black Magic Band
 Secret Colours
 Lorelle Meets the Obsolete
 Arrington De Dionyso
 Golden Dawn Arkestra
 Think No Think

2013 
 The Black Angels
 Roky Erickson
 The Moving Sidewalks
 Silver Apples
 Goat
 Acid Mothers Temple
 Kaleidoscope
 Bass Drum of Death
 The King Khan and BBQ Show
 White Fence
 Om
 The Raveonettes
 Warpaint
 Black Rebel Motorcycle Club
 Tinariwen
 Clinic
 The Growlers
 Deerhunter
 Os Mutantes
 Boris
 The Soft Moon
 The Warlocks
 Wall of Death
 Man or Astro-man?
 Dead Skeletons
 Masaki Batoh's Brain Pulse Music
 Tamaryn
 Gary War
 Suuns
 VietNam
 Black Mountain
 Vinyl Williams
 Indian Jewelry
 Night Beats
 Elephant Stone
 Deap Vally
 Quintron and Miss Pussycat
 The Black Ryder
 Young Magic
 The Laurels
 The Besnard Lakes
 Lumerians
 Spectrum
 The Holydrug Couple
 Holy Wave
 Golden Animals
 The Cult of Dom Keller
 No Joy
 Ride Into the Sun
 The Wolf
 Hollow Trees
 Kay Leotard
 Tjutjuna
 The Shivas
Capsula
 Black Bananas
 Woodsman
 TTotals
 Jackson Scott
 JJUUJJUU
 St. James Society
 Hearts in Space
 Dreamtime
 LSD and the Search for God

2012 
 The Brian Jonestown Massacre
 The Black Angels
 Black Lips
 Dead Meadow
 The Golden Dawn
 Bombino
 Meat Puppets
 The Telescopes
 Dead Confederate
 Night Beats
 Thee Oh Sees
 Black Lips
 Pink Mountaintops
 Spindrift
 The Entrance Band
 Disappears
 Allah-Las
 Wooden Shjips
 Ringo Deathstarr
 Singapore Sling
 Sun Araw
 Prince Rama
 Quilt
 Psychic Ills
 The Olivia Tremor Control
 Wall of Death
 Woods
 The Stepkids
 Federale
 The Vacant Lots
 Quest for Fire
 Feathers
 Moon Duo
 MMoss
 Acid Baby Jesus
 The UFO Club
 Holy Wave
 The Meek
 Strangers Family Band
 Cosmonauts
 The Orange Revival
 Al Lover
 Feeding People
 Peaking Lights
 Sleep Over
 Lotus Plaza
 Mind Spiders
 The Astroid #4
 Smoke and Feathers
 Paperhead
 High Wolf
 Amen Dunes
 Pure X
 The Ripe
 The Blue Angel Lounge
 Ancient River
 Secret Colours
 The Cush
 New Fumes
 Brooklyn Raga Association
 Headdress
 The Band in Heaven

2011 
 The Black Angels
 Roky Erickson
 Black Moth Super Rainbow
 Tobacco
 Crystal Stilts
 A Place to Bury Strangers
 The Growlers
 This Will Destroy You
 Atlas Sound
 The Fresh & Onlys
 Dirty Beaches
 Pontiak
 The Quarter After
 The Soft Moon
 Bass Drum of Death
 The Black Ryder
 Sleepy Sun
 Prefuse 73
 ST37
 Night Beats
 Indian Jewelry
 Beach Fossils
 The Vacant Lots
 Lumerians
 White Hills
 ZAZA
 Radio Moscow
 Pete International Airport – Members of The Dandy Warhols and The Upsidedown
 Crocodiles
 Wall of Death
 Cloudland Cayon
 Christian Bland
 Shapes Have Fangs
 Omar A Rodriguez playing as The Mars Volta lineup
 The Shine Brothers
 Spectrum
 Holy Wave
 Daughters of the Sun
 Chris Catalena
 The Meek
 The Cult of Dom Keller
 Lower Heaven
 No Joy
 The Blue Angel Lounge
 Zechs Marquis
 Hellfire Social
 Sky Drops
 Beaches
 Woodsman
 Ghost Box Orchestra
 Tjutjuna
 Young Prisms
 Weird Owl
 Diamond Center
 Black Hollies
 Sound Mass
 Cold Sun

2010 
 The Black Angels
 Silver Apples
 The Raveonettes
 Warpaint
 Spindrift
 The Gaslamp Killer
 The Warlocks
 Ringo Deathstarr
 Pink Mountaintops
 Indian Jewelry
 Night Beats
 Daughters of the Sun
 Christian Bland & The Revelators
 Golden Animals
 Shapes Have Fangs
 The Tunnels
 Smoke and Feathers
 Headdress
 Von Haze
 PJ and the Bear
 Sisters of Your Sunshine Vapor
 The Vandelles
 Greg Ashley
 The Meek
 The Frequency
 Screen Vinyl Image
 Cry Blood Apache
 City Center
 Telepathik Friend
 Tia Carrera
 Ancient River
 Sky Parade
 Mondo Drag
 Voices Voices
 Yellow Fever
 Pure Ecstasy
 Rayon Beach
 Strangers Family Band
 Ghost Songs
 All in the Golden Afternoon

2009 
 The Black Angels
 Sky "Sunlight" Saxon of The Seeds
 Dead Meadow
 The Warlocks
 The Golden Dawn
 Indian Jewelry
 Wooden Shjips
 A Place to Bury Strangers
 The Strange Boys
 The Upsidedown
 Miranda Lee Richards
 Shapes Have Fangs
 Christian Bland & The Revelators
 Daughters of the Sun
 Cavedweller
 Woven Bones
 Lower Heaven
 Golden Animals
 Smoke and Feathers
 Cartright
 Astronaut Suit
 The Astroid #4
 The Tunnels
 PJ and the Bear
 The Shine Brothers
 The Vandelles
 Forever Changes

2008 
 The Black Angels
 Spindrift
 The Strange Boys
 Acid Tomb
 The Quarter After
 Ringo Deathstarr
 The Upsidedown
 Horse + Donkey
 The Tunnels
 Astronaut Suit
 Cavedweller

Angers, FR Lineups

2014 
 Joel Gion
 Woods
 Loop
 Quilt
 Kadavar
 The GOASTT
 Zombie Zombie
 Allah-Las
 The Soft Moon
 Spindrift
 White Hills
 La Femme
 Ben Frost
 Christian Bland & The Revelators
 Moon Duo
 Amen Dunes
 J.C. Satan
 Aqua Nebula Oscillator
 Orval Carlos Sibelius
 The Astroid #4
 Holy Wave
 POW!
 High Wolf
 Al Lover
 The Eagle's Gift

2013 
 The Black Angels
 Dead Meadow
 Wall of Death
 The Telescopes
 Dead Skeletons
 Tamikrest
 Temples
 Elephant Stone
 Night Beats
 Damo Suzuki
 Beak>
 Strangers Family Band
 Lonely Walk
 Camera
 Lola Colt
 Blondi's Salvation
Mars Red Sky

Chicago Lineups

2016 
 Lightning Bolt (band)
 Chelsea Wolfe
 Health (band)
 Oneohtrix Point Never
 Earthless
 Royal Trux
 Faust (band)
 Gary Wilson
 Ryley Walker
 Night Beats
 Blanck Mass
 Rangda
 Eartheater
 Vaadat Charigim
 Circuit Des Yeux
 Bitchin Bajas
 Night Fields
 Methyl Ethel

2015 
 Swervedriver
 Viet Cong
 Atlas Sound
 Oren Ambarchi
 Lumerians
 Destruction Unit
 Mind over Mirrors
 Jeff Zeigler & Mary Lattimore
 Heaters
 The Pop Group
 Noveller
 Camera
 Heat Leisure
 Vision Fortune
 Christines
 Gateway Drugs

Vancouver, BC Lineups

2015 
 The Black Angels
 Dead Moon
 A Place to Bury Strangers
 Dead Meadow
 The Warlocks
 Joel Gion
 Black Mountain
 Black Lips
 Witch
 Drenge
 Night Beats
 Elephant Stone
 Tobacco
 Atlas Sound
 Ryley Walker
 King Tuff
 Willie Thrasher & Linda Saddlebeck
 Jonathan Toubin's Soul Clap
 Shigeto
 Mystic Braves
 Al Lover
 Peregrine Falls
 Circuit Des Yeux
 Waingro
 JJUUJJUU
 The Shivas
 Sun Ra Star System
 Mr. Elevator & The Brain Hotel
 Amen Dunes
 LA Witch
 Cosmonauts
 Tacocat
 La Luz
 Dead Ghosts
 Dead Quiet
 Curtis Harding
 Mamiffer
 The Backhomes
 Twin River
 Ancients
 Biblical
 White Poppy
 Dada Plan
 Black Wizard
 Gateway Drugs
 Blackbird Blackbird
 Three Wolf Moon
 The Shrine
 All Them Witches

See also 
 Music of Austin, Texas

References

External links 
 Official Website
 Levitation on Facebook
 Levitation on Twitter

Festivals in Austin, Texas
Music of Austin, Texas
Music festivals in France
Music festivals in Texas
Music festivals in Vancouver
Rock festivals in the United States
Music festivals established in 2008
Jam band festivals